The following is a list of players, both past and current, who appeared at least in one game for the HC Slovan Bratislava.


A 
Denis Afinogenov, (2005–06), Ufa, Russia
Kaspars Astashenko, (2006–07), Riga, Latvia

B 
Daniel Babka, (2000–02),
Igor Bacek, (2004–09), Bratislava, Slovakia
Martin Bakos, (2007–08),
Milan Balis, (2005–09),
Libor Barta, (2005–06),
Martin Bartek, (2004–05), Zvolen, Slovakia
Dusan Benda, (2000–04),
Karol Biermann, (2002–04),
Lukas Bohunicky, (2007–09), Bratislava, Slovakia
Igor Bonderev, (2001–02), Riga, Latvia
Tomas Bukovinsky, (2001–03),
Vladimir Buril, (2000–01),
Petr Buzek, (2005–06), Jihlava, Czech Rep.

C 
Brian Casey, (2000–02), St. Johns, NF
Matej Cesik, (2006–07),
Tomas Chlubna, (2005–06),
Zdeno Ciger, (2000–06), Martin, Slovakia

D 
Dusan Devecka, (2005–09),
Róbert Döme, (2007–09), Skalica, Slovakia
Ivan Dornic, (2002–06), Bratislava, Slovakia
Adam Drgon, (2003–05), Trnava, Slovakia
Martin Dubina, (2007–08),
Martin Dulak, (2008–09),
Miroslav Durak, (2005–06), Topoľčany, Slovakia

E 
Boris Ertel, (2004–05),

F 
Branislav Fabry, (2002–05),

G 
Martin Galik, (2002–03), Bratislava, Slovakia
Juraj Gracik, (2006–09), Topoľčany, Slovakia
Vladimir Gyna, (2005–06),

H 
Juraj Halaj, (2001–04),
Jaroslav Halák, (2003–04), Bratislava, Slovakia
Daniel Hancak, (2001–09),
Radoslav Hecl, (2000–06), Partizánske, Slovakia
Radoslav Heel, (2001–02),
Martin Hlavacka, (2008–09),
Jan Horacek, (2004–05), Benešov, Czech Rep.
Sasu Hovi, (2006–07),
Michal Hreus, (2000–09),
Milan Hruska, (2006–09), Topoľčany, Slovakia
Roman Hrusovsky, (2000–01),
Peter Huba, (2006–08),
Marko Hucko, (2007–08),
Michal Hudec, (2000–05),
Martin Hujsa, (2003–09),
Lubomir Hurtaj, (2000–07),

J 
Tomas Janek, (2003–04),
Ondrej Janik, (2008–09),
Branislav Janos, (2003–06),
Tomas Jasko, (2000–02), Bratislava, Slovakia
Miroslav Javin, (2002–03),
Rudolf Jendek, (2000–06),
Peter Junas, (2002–06),
Robin Just, (2005–07), Bratislava, Slovakia

K 
Roman Kadera, (2005–06), Přerov, Czech Rep.
Richard Kapus, (2001–08),
Martin Karafiat, (2004–05),
Tommy Kiviaho, (2000–01), Helsinki, Finland
Peter Klouda, (2005–06),
Andrej Kmec, (2007–08),
Jan Kobezda, (2002–03), Liava, Slovakia
Michal Kokavec, (2002–08), Žilina, Slovakia
Marek Kolba, (2000–03),
Andrej Kollar, (2000–03), Winnipeg, Canada
Lubomir Kolnik, (2000–01),
Ivo Kotaska, (2008–09),
Kristian Kovac, (2005–06),
Jozef Kovacik, (2007–09),
Radoslav Kropac, (2001–09),
Radim Kucharczyk, (2005–06),
David Kudelka, (2005–06), Přerov, Czech Republic
Peter Kudelka, (2007–08),
Roman Kukumberg, (2006–09), Bratislava, Slovakia
Martin Kulha, (2000–09),
Dalibor Kusovsky, (2001–07),

L 
Lukas Lauko, (2006–07),
Miroslav Lazo, (2000–09),
Jan Lipiansky, (2002–09),
Robert Liscak, (2008–09), Skalica, Slovakia
Marek Lison, (2007–09),

M 
Michal Macho, (2002–06), Martin, Slovakia
Oliver Maron, (2000–01), Bratislava, Slovakia
Tibor Melicharek, (2000–01),
Roman Meluzin, (2003–04), Brno, Czech Rep.
Tomas Mery, (2008–09),
Pavol Mihalik, (2001–03), Slovakia
Petr Mika, (2005–06), Prague, Czech Rep.
Craig Millar, (2001–02), Winnipeg, MAN
Daniel Mracka, (2002–03),
Jozef Mrena, (2000–03), Bratislava, Slovakia

N 
Jaroslav Nedved, (2003–04),
Tomas Nekoranec, (2003–04),
Tomas Nemcicky, (2004–06),
Daniel Neumann, (2007–09),
Svetozar Niznansky, (2001–02),
Warren Norris, (2001–02), St. John's, NF
Peter Novajovsky, (2008–09),

O 
Jozef Ondrejka, (2002–04),

P 
Dusan Pasek, (2003–06),
Petr Pavlas, (2002–09), Olomouc, Czech Rep.
Slavomir Pavlicko, (2001–04),
Lukas Pek, (2005–06),
Henrik Petre, (2008–09),
Stanislav Petrik, (2000–02),
Lubomir Pistek, (2000–09), Bratislava, Slovakia
Jan Plch, (2003–04),
Andrej Podkonicky, (2001–02), Zvolen, Czech Rep.
Zdeno Premyl, (2002–03),
Marek Priechodsky, (2000–01), Bratislava, Slovakia
Juraj Prokop, (2004–07), Bratislava, Slovakia
Ondrej Prokop, (2000–01),
Robert Pukalovic, (2003–04),

R 
Igor Rataj, (2000–03),
Darius Rusnak, (2005–06),
Ondrej Rusnak, (2007–08),
Pavol Rybar, (2000–06),

S 
Michal Safarik, (2002–03),
Marcel Sakac, (2001–02), Bratislava, Slovakia
Miroslav Satan, (2003–05), Topoľčany, Slovakia
Normunds Sejejs, (2003–04),
Daniel Seman, (2002–03),
Michal Sersen, (2002–09), Gelnica, Slovakia
Tomas Siffalovic, (2007–09),
Roman Simunek, (2000–01),
Rene Skoliak, (2002–06),
Stanislav Skorvanek, (2006–07),
Karol Sloboda, (2004–06), Bratislava, Slovakia
Martin Sloboda, (2007–09),
Radoslav Sloboda, (2001–02),
Radovan Sloboda, (2000–06), Bratislava, Slovakia
Marian Smerciak, (2002–03),
Olegs Sorokins, (2000–01), Riga, Latvia
Tomas Spila, (2003–06),
Jan Srdinko, (2006–09),
Martin Stajnoch, (2008–09),
Roman Stantien, (2004–05),
Peter Staron, (2006–07),
Juraj Stefanka, (2000–01),
Miroslav Stefanka, (2002–03),
Jozef Stumpel, (2000–01), Nitra, Slovakia
Dmitri Suur, (2000–01), Tallinn, Estonia
Juraj Sykora, (2002–08),

T 
Jan Tabacek, (2001–05), Bratislava, Slovakia
Roman Tvrdon, (2006–07), Trenčín, Slovakia

U 
Marcel Ulehla, (2005–06), Bratislava, Slovakia
Marek Uram, (2006–09),

V 
Lubomir Vaic, (2008–09), Spišská Nová Ves, Slovakia
Tibor Varga, (2003–05),
Rastislav Veselko, (2007–08),
Lubomir Visnovsky, (1999-05), Topoľčany, Slovakia
Tibor Visnovsky, (2003–04),
Matus Vizvary, (2008–09),
Vladimir Vlk, (2002–04),
Marek Vorel, (2006–07),
Martin Vyborny, (2008–09),
Rene Vydareny, (2004–05), Bratislava, Slovakia

W 
Jozef Wagenhoffer, (2004–07), Bratislava, Slovakia
Erik Weissmann, (2000–01),

Z 
Juraj Zemko, (2008–09)

 List
HC Sloan
Slovakia sport-related lists